The 2000 NCAA Women's Gymnastics championship involved 12 schools competing for the national championship of women's NCAA Division I gymnastics. It was the nineteenth NCAA gymnastics national championship and the defending NCAA Team Champion for 1998 was Georgia.  The competition took place in Boise, Idaho, hosted by Boise State University in the BSU Pavilion.  The 2000 Team Champions were the UCLA Bruins. For the individual championship, Heather Brink, Nebraska, 39.625, and Mohini Bhardwaj, UCLA, 39.625 shared the title.

Team Results

Session 1

Session 2

Super Six

References

External links
 NCAA Gymnastics Championship Official site

NCAA Women's Gymnastics championship
NCAA Women's Gymnastics Championship